Glenn Carbonara (born September 17, 1966) is a retired American soccer defender who spent his entire professional career in the American indoor leagues.

Youth
In 1984, Carbonara graduated from Vineland High School.  He was a 1984 Parade Magazine High School All American soccer player.  He holds the single season scoring record for the state of New Jersey with 67 goals set in 1983.  He is a member of the Vineland High School Hall of Fame.  Carbonara attended Rutgers University, playing on the men's soccer team from 1984 to 1988.

Professional
In 1988, the Minnesota Strikers selected Carbonara in the Major Indoor Soccer League draft.  When the Strikers folded, the Baltimore Blast acquired Carbonara's rights.  He spent two seasons in Baltimore, but was released before the 1990-1991 season.  In October 1990, Carbonara signed with the San Diego Sockers.  That season, the Sockers won the league championship while Carbonara was named the Championship Series Unsung Hero.  The Sockers released him during the off-season and Carbonara joined the Illinois Thunder of the National Professional Soccer League.  In 1992, Carbonara moved to the Cleveland Crunch.  In 1993, the Crunch won the NPSL title, giving Carbonara his second of his career.  On December 27, 1996, the Crunch traded Carbonara, Obi Moneme, and Todd Dusosky to the Milwaukee Wave for Matt Knowles.  Carbonara remained with the Wave until 2002.  In 2001, he was named the NPSL Defender of the Year.  On July 24, 2002, the Philadelphia KiXX purchased Carbonara's contract from the Wave.  He played one season, then retired. Carbonara ended his career playing in 10 championship series winning 6 ( 1 with the San Diego Sockers, 2 with the Cleveland Crunch and 3 with the Milwaukee Wave). Carbonara was also a six time all- star in the MISL/NPSL/MSL.

International
Carbonara played for the United States national futsal team.

References

External links
MISL stats
1991-2003 stats

1966 births
Living people
American men's futsal players
American soccer players
Baltimore Blast (1980–1992) players
Cleveland Crunch players
Illinois Thunder players
Major Indoor Soccer League (1978–1992) players
National Professional Soccer League (1984–2001) players
People from Vineland, New Jersey
Philadelphia KiXX players
Rutgers Scarlet Knights men's soccer players
San Diego Sockers (original MISL) players
Association football defenders
Vineland High School alumni
Milwaukee Wave players
Soccer players from New Jersey